Vares: The Path of the Righteous Men is a 2012 Finnish crime film directed by Anders Engström and it is the sixth installment of the Vares film series. The film is the only of the film series where Jasper Pääkkönen doesn't appear as Kyypakkaus or any other character.

Cast
 Antti Reini as Jussi Vares
 Peter Franzén as preacher Taisto Raappana
 Jarmo Mäkinen as Juhana Sulander
 Matti Onnismaa as priest Alanen
 Petteri Summanen as officer Larva
 Eppu Salminen as Juhani Luusalmi
 Merja Larivaara as Elisabeth Raappana
 Markku Maalismaa as priest Hukkanen
 Kari-Pekka Toivonen as senior physician Sulo Hento
 Pekka Huotari as Kalle Riutta
 Aake Kalliala as Paskamantteli the village idiot
 Kari Tapio as himself

References

External links
 

2012 films
2012 crime films
2010s Finnish-language films
Finnish crime films